Allerey is a commune in the Côte-d'Or department in the Bourgogne-Franche-Comté region of eastern France.

The inhabitants of the commune are known as Alériens or Alériennes

Geography
Allerey is located some 40 km north-west of Beaune and 30 km north by north-east of Autun. The D906 road passes through the western part of the commune but the village can only be accessed by smaller roads such as the D16 from the south which continues north-east to Arconcey, the D117A from the west which continues south-east to Arnay-le-Duc, and the D36 from Beurey-Bauguay in the north. The commune consists entirely of farmland except for the forested Bois de Come in the south-eastern corner.

The Ruisseau d'Angot rises in the west of the commune and flows south to join the Nailly river.

Neighbouring communes and villages

History
Allerey was the seat of a lordship in the Middle Ages and there was a Fortified house in the centre of the commune.

Administration

List of Successive Mayors

Demography
In 2017 the commune had 170 inhabitants.

Sites and monuments

The Church of Saint-Pierre contains two items that are registered as historical objects:
The Furniture in the Church
A Stained glass figure (Bay 0) (16th century)

See also
Communes of the Côte-d'Or department

References

External links
Allerey on the old National Geographic Institute website 
Allerey on Géoportail, National Geographic Institute (IGN) website 
Allerey on the 1750 Cassini Map

Communes of Côte-d'Or